Amiran Sanaia (born 3 September 1989) is a Georgian professional footballer who plays as a left-back for Rodez AF.

Career
Born in the Soviet Union, Sanaia moved to France to play club football with Le Mans FC in 2007. He has since played for SC Bastia, Luzenac AP, Paris FC, Les Herbiers VF and Rodez.

Sanaia received his first call-up to the Georgia national team in November 2007. He made his Georgia debut on 16 November 2007, a friendly match 2–1 won against Qatar. He played another match on 31 May 2008 versus Portugal and on 12 August 2009 versus Malta.

References

External links
 
 
 

Living people
1989 births
Footballers from Georgia (country)
Association football fullbacks
Georgia (country) international footballers
Le Mans FC players
SC Bastia players
Luzenac AP players
Paris FC players
Rodez AF players
Championnat National players
Expatriate footballers in France
Expatriate sportspeople from Georgia (country) in France
Expatriate footballers from Georgia (country)